Jesse Huta Galung (born 6 October 1985) is a former professional Dutch tennis player.

Huta Galung has a career-high ATP singles ranking of World No. 91, achieved on 18 February 2014. He also has a career-high ATP doubles ranking of World No. 63, achieved on 19 May 2014.

Performance timelines

Singles

Doubles

ATP career finals

Doubles: 3 (1 title, 2 runner-ups)

ATP Challenger and ITF Futures finals

Singles: 37 (29–8)

Doubles: 23 (6–17)

External links

 Official website 
 
 
 

1985 births
Living people
Dutch male tennis players
Dutch people of Indonesian descent
Sportspeople from Haarlem
People from Hillegom
People of Batak descent
20th-century Dutch people
21st-century Dutch people